KBMQ (88.7 FM) is a radio station  broadcasting a Christian adult contemporary format. Licensed to Monroe, Louisiana, United States. The station is currently owned by Media Ministries Inc.

The station's general manager is Sheryl Ford. 
 
The weekday station lineup includes:

6AM-9AM ON-AIR:  The Morning Show w/ Jeremiah and Sheryl

9AM-12PM ON-AIR:  Julia Taylor

12-3PM ON-AIR:  Bobby Lenox

3PM-7PM ON-AIR:  Mike Kanklefritz

7PM-Midnight ON-AIR:  Lisa Barry

Previous Logos

References

External links

Mass media in Monroe, Louisiana
Contemporary Christian radio stations in the United States
Radio stations established in 1994
1994 establishments in Louisiana
Christian radio stations in Louisiana